Joanelle Romero is an American filmmaker and actress. Romero, who says she has a Native American identity, is the founder and president of Red Nation Television Network and Red Nation International Film Festival. Romero's film American Holocaust: When It’s All Over I’ll Still Be Indian was short-listed for an Academy Award in the Documentary Short Branch category. 

In 2007, she was designated a Women's History Month honoree by the National Women's History Project.

Personal life
Romero was born in Albuquerque, New Mexico, 1957. Her mother, actress Rita Rogers (1936–2012), was born Ida Mae Aragón in Albuquerque, New Mexico. Joanelle grew up in Los Angeles, California, and says she is "a citizen of Mescalero-Chiricahua Apache, Dinétah, Paiute Nations and is SpanishSephardic". She states she is of Cheyenne descent.

Career
Romero was shortlisted for an Academy Award, for her documentary short, American Holocaust: When It’s All Over I’ll Still Be Indian, narrated by Ed Asner. Romero directed, produced, wrote and scored the music for the film that compares the Holocaust with the United States governments treatment of American Indians and the lasting effects on contemporary culture.

In 1991 Romero founded Spirit World Productions. She was inspired to create Spirit World Productions due to the lack of Native representation in the entertainment industry. Spirit World released American Holocaust: When It’s All Over I’ll Still Be Indian, a documentary film narrated by Ed Asner. Romero directed, produced, wrote and scored the music for the film that compares the Holocaust with the United States' government treatment of American Indians and the lasting effects on contemporary culture.

As an actress Romero has appeared in films including The Girl Called Hatter Fox (1977 TV movie based on the novel by Marilyn Harris), 1982's Barbarosa and Parasite, and ''Powwow Highway.

Romero founded the nonprofit organization Red Nation Celebration Institute (RNCI) in 1995.

In 2005 she received the Armin T. Wegner Humanitarian Award for "the vision to see the truth … and the courage to speak it". Romero started the first Native American Heritage Month in Los Angeles in November 2005, garnering her the title "The First Lady" of American Indian Heritage Month.

Romero has been a member of the American Film Academy since 2016.

Filmography

Film

Television

Video games

References

External links

American humanitarians
Women humanitarians
American people of Jewish descent
American people who self-identify as being of Native American descent
American filmmakers
American folk musicians
Actresses from Los Angeles
Actresses from Albuquerque, New Mexico
Living people
Musicians from Albuquerque, New Mexico
Activists from California
21st-century American women